Holy Weather is the second album by South African alternative rock band Civil Twilight. Written and recorded in the years following their debut album, Civil Twilight, the album was released 26 March 2012 in both the United States and other regions including the United Kingdom, Canada and South Africa. The album has received generally positive reviews, with many comparing the outfit to early-generation U2.

Background and development
After the release of their debut album, Civil Twilight toured around the United States and Europe playing at many popular venues including Bonnaroo in 2011. After returning from that tour, the band began work on the album. According to a blog post on their website, Burial, James Blake and The National were some of the big influences on the direction of their album.

Critical reception

Holy Weather has received generally positive reviews since its release. Many reviews have made connections between Civil Twilight and some of their contemporaries, such as Muse, U2 and Radiohead.

Commercial performance
Holy Weather debuted at number 3 on the Billboard Heatseekers album chart. It stayed on the chart for more than two weeks, falling to number 31 by 13 April. The album also debuted at number 124 on the Billboard 200 and number 20 on the Rock Albums chart. The first single, Fire Escape charted at number 44 on the Rock Songs chart and number 22 on the Alternative Songs chart.

Track listing

Personnel 
 Steven McKellar – bass guitar, lead vocals, keyboards
 Andrew McKellar – guitar, backing vocals
 Richard Wouters – drums, percussion

References 

Civil Twilight (band) albums
2012 albums